Epistenia is a genus of wasps in the family Pteromalidae.

Species 
 Epistenia americana Girault
 Epistenia basalis Walker
 Epistenia bella Strand
 Epistenia burksi Hedqvist
 Epistenia cameroni Ozdikmen
 Epistenia chilensis Brèthes
 Epistenia coeruleata Westwood
 Epistenia conica Brèthes
 Epistenia cyanea (Fabricius)
 Epistenia gemmata Girault
 Epistenia goethei Girault
 Epistenia imperialis Smith
 Epistenia liguensis Brèthes
 Epistenia media Hedqvist
 Epistenia odyneri Ashmead
 Epistenia polita (Say)
 Epistenia regalis Cockerell
 Epistenia rufipes Cameron
 Epistenia schmidti (Brèthes)
 Epistenia scutellata Brèthes
 Epistenia westwoodi (Guérin-Méneville)

References

External links 
 

Pteromalidae
Hymenoptera genera